Launer is a surname. Notable people with the surname include:

Dale Launer (born 1952), American comedy screenwriter
Gerhard Launer (born 1949), German photographer
S. John Launer (1919–2006), American television and film actor

See also 
Launer London, British manufacturer of luxury handbags 
Lauener